Teemu Metso (born August 23, 1985) is a Finnish professional ice hockey player who played with Kärpät in the SM-liiga during the 2010-11 season.

References

External links

1985 births
Finnish ice hockey defencemen
Oulun Kärpät players
Living people
Sportspeople from Oulu